Waved Out is the second solo studio album by the American indie rock musician Robert Pollard, released in 1998 on Matador Records.

Critical reception

The Guardian wrote that "it's a GBV album in all but name, which means poor editing skills, an early Genesis fixation, and a song called 'Showbiz Opera Walrus' that could have been recorded in Pollard's bath." The Sunday Times thought that "perhaps—as ex-Car Ric Ocasek is set to produce the next GBV album—Waved Out was designed to be Pollard's last stab at his trademark lo- fi ramshackledness." The Dayton Daily News concluded that "on its shortest cuts, Waved Out sounds like standard Pollard, undercooked."

Track listing
"Make Use" – 3:16
"Vibrations in the Woods" – 1:05
"Just Say the Word" – 3:00
"Subspace Biographies" – 2:57
"Caught Waves Again" – 1:52
"Waved Out" – 1:14
"Whiskey Ships" – 1:59
"Wrinkled Ghost" – 1:57
"Artificial Light" – 1:03
"People Are Leaving" – 2:37
"Steeple of Knives" – 2:12
"Rumbling Joker" – 2:53
"Showbiz Opera Walrus" – 2:34
"Pick Seeds from My Skull" – 1:07
"Second Step Next Language" – 4:34

Personnel

Musicians 

 Robert Pollard – vocals, guitar
 John Shough – bass guitar (tracks 1, 4, 7, 11, 12)
 Jim Macpherson – drums (tracks 1, 4, 7, 11, 12)
 Doug Gillard – guitar (track 5)
 Brett Owesly – organ (track 13)
 Tobin Sprout – piano (track 8)
 Kattie Dougherty – trumpet (track 7)

Technical 

 Robert Pollard – engineering (track 5)
 Tobin Sprout – engineering (track 8, 14)
 Dave Doughman – engineering
 John Shough – engineering
 Frank Longo – cover artwork
 Mark Ohe – cover artwork

References 

1998 albums
Robert Pollard albums